Make Way for Dionne Warwick is the third studio album by American singer Dionne Warwick. It was released by Scepter Records on August 31, 1964 in the United States.  Propelled by the hit singles "Walk on By," "You'll Never Get to Heaven," and "Wishin' and Hopin'", it became Warwick's first album to enter the US charts, reaching the top ten of Top R&B/Hip-Hop Albums.

Background
Make Way for Dionne Warwick is notable for including the singles "Walk On By", Warwick's second top ten hit on the US Billboard Hot 100. Also featured are "You'll Never Get to Heaven (If You Break My Heart)", "A House Is Not a Home", "Reach Out for Me", and one of the first recordings of "(They Long to Be) Close to You." "Get Rid of Him" is actually a 1962 track by The Shirelles, with Warwick's vocal replacing that of Shirley Alston. The album was digitally remastered and reissued on CD on November 29, 2011 by Collectables Records.

Critical reception

Allmusic editor Lindsay Planer gave the album three stars out of five. She remarked that while "Wishin' and Hopin'" and "I Smiled Yesterday" had "also been included on Warwick's debut album, Presenting Dionne Warwick. However, that didn't seem to deter listeners eager for new tunes. Warwick's musical mentors and collaborators Burt Bacharach and Hal David also presented the singer with several additional compositions that would become signature songs for other performers in the ensuing years."

Track listing

Charts

References

External links
Make Way for Dionne Warwick at Discogs

Dionne Warwick albums
1964 albums
Albums produced by Burt Bacharach
Albums produced by Hal David
Scepter Records albums